Maror ( mārôr) refers to the bitter herbs eaten at the Passover Seder in keeping with the biblical commandment  "with bitter herbs they shall eat it." (Exodus 12:8).

Biblical source
In some listings of the 613 commandments, such as the Minchat Chinuch, the biblical obligation to consume maror is included within the commandment to consume the meat of the sacrificial Paschal offering. 

Ever since the Paschal offering ceased to exist with the destruction of the Temple in Jerusalem in 70 CE, the obligation to consume maror on the first night of Passover has been rabbinical in nature.

The only two biblical references to the maror are the verse quoted above (Exodus 12:8) in which it is mentioned in reference to the offering, and in Numbers 9:11 where "They are to eat the lamb, together with the unleavened bread and bitter herbs". This is in contradistinction to the obligation to consume matzo on the first night of Passover, which remains a biblical commandment even in the absence of the Paschal Lamb, because there are other biblical verses that mention matzo as a standalone obligation (Exodus 12:18, Deuteronomy 16:8)

Symbolism
According to the Haggadah, the traditional text which is recited at the Seder and which defines the Seder's form and customs, the maror symbolizes the bitterness of slavery in Egypt. The following verse from the Torah underscores that symbolism: "And they embittered (ve-yimareru וימררו) their lives with hard labor, with mortar and with bricks and with all manner of labor in the field; any labor that they made them do was with hard labor" (Exodus 1:14).

Use at the Seder

Maror is one of the foods placed on the Passover Seder Plate and there is a rabbinical requirement to eat maror at the Seder. Chazeret is used for the requirement called Korech, in which the maror is eaten together with matzo. There are various customs about the kinds of maror placed at each location.

During the Seder, each participant recites a specific blessing over the maror and eats it. It is first dipped into the charoset— a brown, pebbly mixture which symbolizes the mortar with which the Israelites bound bricks for the Egyptians.  The excess charoset is then shaken off and the maror is eaten.

The halakha (Jewish law) prescribes the minimum amount of maror that should be eaten to fulfil the mitzvah (a kazayis or kezayit, literally meaning the volume of an olive) and the amount of time in which it should be consumed. To fulfil the obligation, the flavour of the maror must be unadulterated by cooking or preservatives, such as being soaked in vinegar.

Types of maror
The Mishnah specifies five types of bitter herbs eaten on the night of Passover: ḥazzeret (lettuce), ʿuleshīn (endive/chicory), temakha, ḥarḥavina (possibly melilot, or Eryngium creticum), and maror (likely Sonchus oleraceus, sowthistle). The most common vegetables currently used as bitter herbs are horseradish and romaine lettuce.

Hazzeret
Hazzeret is undoubtedly domestic lettuce. The word is cognate to other Near-Eastern terms for lettuce: the Talmud identifies hazzeret as hassa, similar to the Akkadian hassu and the Arabic hash.

Modern varieties of lettuce are only slightly bitter or not at all, such as iceberg lettuce and romaine lettuce. However, in the past domestic lettuce was bitter, and heirloom varieties of lettuce that are bitter are still available to gardeners. Romaine lettuce is the most commonly used variety, perhaps because it still preserves a slight bitter taste. In addition, the Talmud remarks that Romaine lettuce is not initially bitter, but becomes so later on, which is symbolic of the experience of the Jews in Egypt. The "later" bitterness of lettuce refers to fact that lettuce plants become bitter after they "bolt" (flower), a process which occurs naturally when days lengthen or temperatures rise.

Wild or prickly lettuce (Lactuca serriola) is listed in Tosefta Pisha as suitable for maror under the name חזרת הגל or חזרת גלין. However, its absence from the approved list in the Mishnah and Talmud indicate that it is not halakhically suitable.

`Ulshin
The second species listed in the Mishnah is `ulshin, which is a plural to refer to both wild and cultivated types of plants in the genus Cichorium. The term is cognate to other near-eastern terms for endives, such as Aramaic עלת and Arabic `alath.

Tamcha
The Talmud Yershalmi identified Hebrew tamcha with Greek  gingídion, which has been positively identified via the illustration in the Vienna Dioscurides as the wild carrot Daucus gingidium.

Rabbi Yom-Tov Lipmann Heller, in his Tosafot Yom-Tov, identified the Mishna's temakha with Yiddish chreyn (horseradish). This identification has long been recognized as problematic, as horseradish does not grow natively in Israel and was not available to Jews in the Mishnaic period.

Horseradish likely began to be used because leafy vegetables like lettuce did not grow in the northern climates Ashkenazi Jews had migrated to, and because some sources allow the use of any bitter substance (if so, the five species in the mishnah would only be illustrative examples).

Many Jews use horseradish condiment (a mixture of cooked horseradish, beetroot and sugar), though the Shulchan Aruch requires that maror be used as is, that is raw, and not cooked or mixed with salt, vinegar, sugar, lemon, or beets.

Harhavina
The identity of harhavina is somewhat disputed. It may be melilot or Eryngium creticum.

Maror
The identity of this species was preserved among the Jews of Yemen as the plant Sonchus oleraceus, a relative of dandelion native to Israel. The word "maror" is an autohyponym, referring both to this species specifically, and to any species suitable for use at the Seder.

References

Passover foods
Passover seder
Jewish ceremonial food and drink
Positive Mitzvoth